Don Francis Bowman "Sugarcane" Harris (June 18, 1938 – November 30, 1999) was an American blues and rock and roll violinist and guitarist. He is considered a pioneer in the amplification of the violin.

Career
Harris was born and raised in Pasadena, California, United States. His parents were carnival entertainers. As a youth, he studied classical violin, and learned additional instruments including harmonica, piano and guitar.

Harris began performing with a doo-wop group, The Squires, which included his childhood friend, the pianist Dewey Terry. The Squires recorded for Vita Records. Harris performed in Little Richard's band in the 1960s.

Don & Dewey 
Harris and Terry formed a duo in 1956 as Don and Dewey. They were recorded by Art Rupe on his Specialty label, mostly utilizing the services of legendary drummer Earl Palmer. The duo also recorded on Rupe's other labels, Los Angeles Spot and Shade. Don & Dewey had no hits as an act, but several songs they co-wrote and recorded became early rock and roll classics for other musicians. These include "Farmer John" (the Premiers and, later, Neil Young), "Justine" (the Righteous Brothers), "I'm Leaving It Up to You" (Dale and Grace), and "Big Boy Pete" (the Olympics). Harris was given the nickname "Sugarcane" by bandleader Johnny Otis, due to his reputation as a ladies' man.

Frank Zappa and John Mayall's Bluesbreakers 
After separating from Dewey Terry in the 1960s, Harris moved almost exclusively over to the electric violin. He reappeared as a sideman with John Mayall & the Bluesbreakers and Frank Zappa, most recognized for his appearances on Hot Rats and on the Mothers of Invention albums Burnt Weeny Sandwich and Weasels Ripped My Flesh. His lead vocal and blues violin solo on a cover of Little Richard's "Directly from My Heart to You" on Weasels, and his extended solo on "Little House I Used To Live In" on Weeny are considered highlights of those albums. Zappa, who had long admired Harris' playing, reportedly bailed him out of jail, resurrecting his career and ushering in a long period of creativity for the forgotten violin virtuoso. He played a couple of live concerts with Zappa's band in 1970 and performed on four of Zappa's solo albums.

Pure Food and Drug Act 
During the early 1970s, Harris led the Pure Food and Drug Act, which included drummer Paul Lagos, guitarists Harvey Mandel and Randy Resnick, and bassist Victor Conte, who was the founder of the Bay Area Laboratory Co-operative. Conte replaced Larry Taylor, who was the original bass player. Conte went on to play with Tower of Power and Herbie Hancock. In their first concert, PFDA opened for Johnny Otis at El Monte Legion Hall. The audience was excited by Sugarcane's energy, his playing, singing and stage antics. While the performance showed the promise of the group, Don's issues with controlled substances was a constant struggle, eventually contributing to his death.

In the 1980s, Sugarcane was a member of the Los Angeles-based experimental rock band Tupelo Chain Sex.

Personal life and death
Harris' marriage ended in divorce. He had a daughter and two sons. He was addicted to drugs throughout his career. For most of his later years, he had a pulmonary disease. He died on November 27, 1999, at home in Los Angeles, California, at age 61.

Discography

As leader
 Keep On Driving (MPS/BASF, 1970)
 Sugarcane (Epic, 1970)
 Fiddler On the Rock (MPS, 1971)
 New Violin Summit with Jean-Luc Ponty, Nipso Brantner, Michal Urbaniak (MPS/BASF, 1971)
 Sugar Cane's Got the Blues (MPS/BASF, 1972)
 Cup Full Of Dreams (MPS/BASF, 1973)
 I'm On Your Case (MPS/BASF, 1974)
 Keyzop (MPS, 1975)
 Flashin' Time (MPS, 1976)

Don & Dewey
 Don and Dewey (1974)
 Bim Bam! (1985)
 Jungle Hop (1991)

As sideman
With John Lee Hooker
 Folk Blues (1959)
 Born in Mississippi (1973)
 Free Beer and Chicken (1974)

With Little Richard
 Little Richard Is Back (1964)
 Well Alright! (1970)

With Harvey Mandel
 The Snake (1972)
 Shangrenade (1973)

With John Mayall
 USA Union (1970)
 Back To The Roots (1971)
 Ten Years Are Gone (1973)
 Notice to Appear (1975)
 New Year, New Band, New Company (1975)
 Banquet in Blues (1976)
 Archives to Eighties (1988)
 Room to Move (1969–1974) (1992)
 Cross Country Blues (1994)

With The Mothers of Invention
 Burnt Weeny Sandwich (1970)
 Weasels Ripped My Flesh (1970)

With Johnny Otis
 Cold Shot (1969)
 Cuttin' Up The Johnny Otis Show (1971)

With Tupelo Chain Sex
 Ja-Jazz (1983)
 Spot the Difference (1984)

With Frank Zappa
 Hot Rats (1969)
 Chunga's Revenge (1970)
 Apostrophe (') (1974)
 The Lost Episodes (1996)

With others
 Billy Bang, Changing Seasons (1980)
 Pure Food & Drug Act, Choice Cuts (1972)
 Freddie Roulette, Sweet Funky Steel (1993)
 Sonny Terry and Brownie McGhee, Sonny & Brownie (1973)

References

External links

Sugarcane Harris at united-mutations.com

1938 births
1999 deaths
Guitarists from California
Musicians from Pasadena, California
20th-century American guitarists
20th-century American violinists
American blues guitarists
American male guitarists
American male violinists
American rock guitarists
American rock violinists
John Mayall & the Bluesbreakers members
The Mothers of Invention members
20th-century American male musicians